Hāwai is a coastal settlement in the Ōpōtiki District and Bay of Plenty Region of New Zealand's North Island.

History

Hāwai is in the rohe (traditional tribal area) of Te Whānau-ā-Apanui.

Te Whānau ā Apanui placed a rāhui on over 130 kilometres of coastline, west from Hāwai, following the 2019 Whakaari / White Island eruption.

During the 2020 coronavirus lockdown, Te Whānau-ā-Apanui set up road checkpoints to monitor and restrict travel into and through Hāwai. The restrictions were supported by Ōpōtiki District Council and New Zealand Police. According to The Guardian, the checkpoints operated 24 hours a day, unlike checkpoints set up by other iwi in other settlements.

The restrictions lasted 47 days, from 12pm on 25 March until the delivery of a karakia at 12pm on 11 May.

Te Whānau-ā-Apanui also set up initiatives during the lockdown to ensure elderly residents of Hāwai had access to essentials.

Marae

The settlement has two marae of Te Whānau-ā-Apanui.

Maraenui Marae is a meeting place for the hapū of Te Whānau a Hikarukutai; its meeting house is called Te Iwarau.

Tunapahore Marae is a meeting place for the hapū of Te Whānau a Haraawaka; its meeting house is called Haraawaka.

Education

References

Ōpōtiki District
Populated places in the Bay of Plenty Region